Sthenognatha is a genus of tiger moths in the family Erebidae. There is some confusion surrounding the subsequent spelling by Rogenhofer, 1875, as Stenognatha; this spelling was used by many authors prior to 1980, and under ICZN Article 33.3.1 it may need to be preserved, though many authors after 1980 have reverted to Sthenognatha (e.g.).

Species
 Sthenognatha cinda Schaus, 1938
 Sthenognatha flinti Todd, 1982
 Sthenognatha gentilis Felder & Felder, 1874
 Sthenognatha toddi Lane & Watson, 1975

References

Natural History Museum Lepidoptera generic names catalog

 
Pericopina
Moth genera